Nicholas Johncarlo Pivetta (born February 14, 1993) is a Canadian professional baseball pitcher for the Boston Red Sox of Major League Baseball (MLB). The Washington Nationals selected Pivetta in the fourth round of the 2013 MLB draft. He was traded to the Philadelphia Phillies during the 2015 season, and made his MLB debut with them in 2017 and played with them through 2020.

Career

High school and college
Pivetta was born in Victoria, British Columbia, Canada. He attended Lambrick Park Secondary School in Saanich, British Columbia.  He missed pitching his senior year in high school due to an ulnar collateral ligament injury in his right elbow.  He was a member of the Canadian Junior National Team from 2009–12, pitching in the 2010 18U World Championship.

He attended New Mexico Junior College where he played for the Thunderbirds on a baseball scholarship, and graduated in 2013. In his first season, he was 4–1 with a 4.83 ERA in 54 innings. As a sophomore in 2013, he was 9–2 with a 3.36 ERA, had a .235 batting average against, and pitched six complete games. Baseball America named him the 6th-best junior college prospect in 2013, and Perfect Game USA ranked him the 3rd-best junior college prospect, as his fastball reached as high as 97 miles per hour.  He played for the Victoria Eagles of the youth baseball British Columbia Premier Baseball League, and the Victoria HarbourCats of the collegiate summer West Coast League.

Washington Nationals
The Washington Nationals selected Pivetta in the fourth round of the 2013 MLB draft out of New Mexico Junior College. He signed with the Nationals for $364,300, and made his professional debut with the Gulf Coast Nationals of the Rookie Gulf Coast League. He ended the season with the Auburn Doubledays of the Class A- New York-Pennsylvania League. In nine games (eight starts) between the two teams, he was 1–1 with a 2.91 ERA.

Pivetta spent 2014 with the Class A Hagerstown Suns, where he was a South Atlantic League mid-season All-Star, the June 23 SAL Pitcher of the Week, and where his 13 wins were third in the SAL and tied for first among all Washington minor leaguers. He finished the season with a 13–8 record, 4.22 ERA, and 1.37 WHIP in 26 games (25 starts; tied for 7th in the league). Following the season, Baseball America named him the 10th-best prospect in the Nationals' minor league system.

In 2015, Pivetta was 7–4 with a 2.29 ERA for the Class A-Advanced Potomac Nationals, and was a Carolina League All Star.

Philadelphia Phillies

2015–2017
On July 28, 2015, the Nationals traded Pivetta to the Philadelphia Phillies for Jonathan Papelbon.

In 2016, he was 11–6 (his 11 wins were 3rd in the league) with a 3.41 ERA (6th) and 111 strikeouts (6th) for the  Double-A Reading Phillies, with whom Pivetta was an Eastern League mid-season All Star. He was also 1–2 with a 2.55 ERA and 27 strikeouts in 24.2 innings in five starts for the Triple-A Lehigh Valley IronPigs. The Phillies added him to their 40-man roster after the 2016 season.

Pivetta played for Team Canada in the 2017 World Baseball Classic.

In 2017, Pivetta went 5–0 with a 1.41 ERA for the IronPigs, and was Phillies Minor League Pitcher of the Week for the week ended April 16. Pivetta was promoted to the 25-man roster on April 30, making his MLB debut the same day against the Los Angeles Dodgers. He went 8–10 with a 6.02 ERA and 140 strikeouts in 133 innings for the Phillies. Among Major League rookies, he was 1st in strikeouts-per-nine-innings-pitched (9.47, minimum 125 innings pitched; the highest ratio ever by a Phillies rookie with at least 25 starts), and 3rd in strikeouts (140; tied for the 9th-most strikeouts in a season ever by a Phillies rookie).

2018–2020

In 2018, Pivetta was 7–14 with a 4.77 ERA, 5th in the National League with 10.32 strikeouts-per-9-innings-pitched (the 2nd-highest rate of any Phillie pitcher in franchise history, behind Curt Schilling's 11.29 in 1997), 8th in the NL in strikeouts (188) and wild pitches (11), 9th in the NL in games started (32) and strikeouts/walk (3.69), and led the major leagues in allowing opposing batters the highest batting average on balls in play (.326). He struck out a career-high 13 batters on June 18 against St. Louis. His fastball was clocked as high as 98 miles per hour.

In 2019, Pivetta struggled at the beginning of the season before being demoted to AAA. With Lehigh Valley he was 5–1 with a 3.07 ERA, as in 9 games (6 starts) and 41.0 innings he struck out 58 batters (with a 12.7 strikeouts/innings ratio, 5th-best in the International League), and giving up 23 hits had the best hits/9 innings ratio in the league at 5.0.  On July 19, it was announced he would be shifted to a relief role. In 2019 with the Phillies he was 4–6 with one save and a 5.38 ERA, as in 30 games (13 starts) he pitched 93.2 innings.

Pivetta made three appearances with Philadelphia during the start-delayed 2020 season, registering a 15.88 ERA in  innings pitched.

Boston Red Sox
On August 21, 2020, Pivetta was traded to the Boston Red Sox, along with Connor Seabold, in exchange for Brandon Workman, Heath Hembree and cash. Pivetta was added to Boston's active roster on September 22, making a start that day against the Baltimore Orioles. In his two appearances for the 2020 Red Sox, Pivetta earned two wins while compiling a 1.80 ERA with 13 strikeouts in 10 innings pitched.

Pivetta started the 2021 season as part of Boston's starting rotation. In his first seven starts, he compiled a 5–0 record, before being placed on the COVID-related injured list for one day, May 12, due to vaccine side effects. On June 24, Pivetta pitched a no hitter for  against the Tampa Bay Rays; he was removed from the game after throwing more than 100 pitches, and the Red Sox went on to lose both the no hitter and the game. On September 5, Pivetta was placed on the COVID-related list; he returned to the team on September 12. Overall during the regular season, Pivetta made 31 appearances (30 starts) for Boston, compiling a 9–8 record with 4.53 ERA—he earned a save in his lone relief appearance—while striking out 175 batters in 155 innings. He made three appearances (one start) in the postseason, allowing four runs in  innings.

Pivetta returned to the Red Sox rotation in 2022; making 33 starts he compiled a 10–12 record with a 4.56 ERA while striking out 175 batters in  innings.

On January 13, 2023, the Red Sox and Pivetta reached agreement on a one-year contract, avoiding salary arbitration.

Pitching style 
Pivetta throws a four-seam fastball, a curveball, a slider, and a changeup. He relies mostly on his fastball, which averages , and his two breaking balls. In 2017 and 2018, he threw his fastball 59% of the time, his  curve 19% of the time, and his  slider 15% of the time.

References

External links

1993 births
Living people
Auburn Doubledays players
Baseball people from British Columbia
Boston Red Sox players
Canadian expatriate baseball players in the United States
Gulf Coast Nationals players
Hagerstown Suns players
Harrisburg Senators players
Lehigh Valley IronPigs players
Major League Baseball players from Canada
Major League Baseball pitchers
NMJC Thunderbirds baseball players
Philadelphia Phillies players
Potomac Nationals players
Reading Fightin Phils players
Sportspeople from Victoria, British Columbia
Victoria HarbourCats players
World Baseball Classic players of Canada
2017 World Baseball Classic players